The 2021 U.S. F2000 National Championship will be the twelfth season of the U.S. F2000 National Championship since its revival in 2010. The championship serves as the first rung of the IndyCar Series's Road to Indy ladder system. An 18 race schedule was announced on October 21, 2020 featuring five permanent road courses, two street circuits, and a single oval in the Dave Steele Classic.

Drivers and teams

Schedule 

* The race at Lucas Oil Raceway was originally scheduled for May 28, but was postponed due to inclement weather.  The October Mid-Ohio race replaced Toronto.

Race results

Championship standings

Drivers' Championship
Scoring system

 The driver who qualifies on pole is awarded one additional point.
 One point is awarded to the driver who leads the most laps in a race.
 One point is awarded to the driver who sets the fastest lap during the race.

† Bijoy Garg was not eligible for points at the New Jersey Motorsports Park and the second Mid-Ohio rounds for exceeding the maximum allotted test days for championship drivers.

See also 

 2021 IndyCar Series
 2021 Indy Lights
 2021 Indy Pro 2000 Championship

References

External links
 U.S. F2000 official website

2021
U.S. F2000 National Championship